After Hours is an album by the Prestige All Stars nominally led by trumpeter Thad Jones recorded in 1957 and released on the Prestige label. The album was also re-released as Steamin' by Frank Wess and Kenny Burrell in 1963.

Reception

Scott Yanow of Allmusic reviewed the album, stating "The all-star lineup is in fine form on the straightahead material and bop fans will want to pick up this".

Track listing 
All compositions by Mal Waldron.

 "Steamin'" – 9:20  
 "Blue Jelly" – 11:20  
 "Count One" – 7:52  
 "Empty Street" – 12:35

Personnel 
Thad Jones – trumpet 
Frank Wess – flute, tenor saxophone 
Mal Waldron – piano
Kenny Burrell – guitar
Paul Chambers – bass
Art Taylor – drums

Production
Bob Weinstock – supervisor
Rudy Van Gelder – engineer

References 

Thad Jones albums
1957 albums
Prestige Records albums
Albums produced by Bob Weinstock
Albums recorded at Van Gelder Studio